Ciudad Camargo may refer to:
Camargo, Chihuahua, Mexico
Camargo Municipality, Tamaulipas, Mexico